Aphis is a genus of insects in the family Aphididae containing at least 600 species of aphids. It includes many notorious agricultural pests, such as the soybean aphid Aphis glycines. Many species of Aphis, such as A. coreopsidis and  A. fabae, are myrmecophiles, forming close associations with ants.

Selected Species 
Aphis affinis
Aphis asclepiadis — milkweed aphid
Aphis craccae — tufted vetch aphid
Aphis craccivora — cowpea aphid
Aphis fabae — black bean aphid
Aphis genistae 
Aphis gossypii — cotton aphid
Aphis glycines — soybean aphid
Aphis helianthi — sunflower aphid
Aphis nerii — oleander aphid
Aphis pomi — apple aphid
Aphis rubicola — small raspberry aphid
Aphis spiraecola — spirea aphid (syn. Aphis citricola — citrus aphid)
Aphis valerianae — black valerian aphid

See also
 List of Aphis species

Photos

References

External links

 Bugguide.net. Genus Aphis
 Key to Aphis of the midwestern US

 
Sternorrhyncha genera
Taxa named by Carl Linnaeus

it:Aphis fabae